Lifetime was a British entertainment television channel that launched on 4 November 2013, that was owned by A&E Networks UK, a joint venture between A&E Networks and Sky Group. The channel replaced Bio.

On 6 November 2018, the European Commission required The Walt Disney Company to sell A&E's European channels, including Lifetime.

Programmes aired in the past on the channel included American Lifetime originals such as The Client List, Damages, Witches of East End, and an original series called The Proposers.

It launched on TalkTalk on 28 August 2014 along with its sister channels.

The network was unsuccessful in establishing itself in the market, as Lifetime's American original programming generally already aired on other networks, and remained so even after the launch of the domestic Lifetime; it was forced to carry out-of-format programming from American sister network A&E and History to maintain a full schedule, and it had limited original programming output, including Dance Mums, a local spin-off of Dance Moms that only lasted two series. The network's last prime programming, daily runs and premieres of the American series Judge Judy, left its schedule in 2019, and within months, it began to decline as a going concern.

On 24 January 2019, the HD version closed on Sky. On 7 March 2019, the +1 version closed on all platforms. The network shut down in its entirety at 12:00am and removed at 6:00 on 1 March 2021.

Closure
A+E Networks announced on the 11th February 2021 that Lifetime would be closing on all platforms at the end of the month. A+E made an agreement with Discovery, Inc. that the channels original content would move to Discovery +. The last programme that aired was an episode of Sex Lies and Murder. The channel then aired two Crime and Investigation trailers and a trailer for Bringing Up Bates. It then closed at 12:00 am and removed at 6:00 am on the 1st March 2021.

Former programming
 Australia's Next Top Model
 Bring It!
 Bonnie & Clyde
 Britain's Next Top Model  
 Cajun Pawn Stars
 The Client List
 Damages
 Dance Moms
 Dance Mums with Jennifer Ellison
 Duck Dynasty
 Flipping Vegas
 Frisky Business
 Girlfriends' Guide to Divorce
 Hardcore Pawn
 The Haunting Of...
 I Can Make You a Supermodel
 Judge Judy 
 Little Women: Atlanta
 Little Women: LA
 Little Women: NY
 The Mother/Daughter Experiment
 Pawn Stars
 Pitch Slapped
 Project Runway
 The Proposers
 The Rap Game
 The Real Housewives
 Shahs of Sunset
 Storage Wars
 Vanderpump Rules
 Wahlburgers
 Witches of East End

See also
 Lifetime
 Lifetime (Canada)
 Lifetime Real Women
 LMN

References

External links
 

A&E Networks
Sky television channels
Television channels and stations established in 2013
Television channels and stations disestablished in 2021
Defunct television channels in the United Kingdom
2013 establishments in the United Kingdom
2021 disestablishments in the United Kingdom